Panama observes Eastern Standard Zone (UTC−5) year-round.

IANA time zone database 
In the IANA time zone database, Panama is given one zone in the file zone.tab—America/Panama. "PA" refers to the country's ISO 3166-1 alpha-2 country code. Data for Panama directly from zone.tab of the IANA time zone database; columns marked with * are the columns from zone.tab itself:

References

External links 
Current time in Panama at Time.is
Time in Panama at TimeAndDate

Time in Panama